Miejski Klub Sportowy Supraślanka Supraśl is a football club from Supraśl, Poland. It was found in 1934.They're currently playing in B Klasa (VII level)

Supraślanka participated in the qualifying round of the 2005–06 Polish Cup, where the club lost to OKS 1945 Olsztyn, and in the preliminary round of the 2008–09 Polish Cup, where they would lose to Lechia II Gdańsk.

References

External links
 info about club on 90minut.pl

Association football clubs established in 1934
Football clubs in Podlaskie Voivodeship
1934 establishments in Poland